Kanoon is an Indian television courtroom drama/crime series. The 111-episode Hindi series had its original run from 1993 to 1996 on DD Metro. It was produced by B. R. Chopra and directed by his son Ravi Chopra. The music was composed by Ravi. Make-up for the series was done by Vimal Devkar. The concept of the story was given by Satish Bhatnagar, Sachin Bhowmik, Kulwant Jain and Hasan Kamal. Four seasons of the show were telecasted.

Each episode ran for approximately 25 minutes and began with a title song rendered by Mahendra Kapoor.

Summary
This TV serial by the Bollywood producer B. R. Chopra is styled after several of the movies he made and named after the famous movie, Kanoon (1960). The protagonist is a lawyer, assisted by a secretary and an assistant. The serial features several crime cases, which run to multiple episodes each.

Cast

Main

Pankaj Dheer as Vijay Saxena
Ananth Narayan Mahadevan as Pasha Polyster
Vinod Kapoor as Inspector Shakti Singh
Deep Dhillon as Public Prosecutor Indrajeet Singh
Kavita Kapoor as Milli

Episodewise

Episodes

Other crew

See also

 Mahabharat (1988 TV series)

References

External links
 

1993 Indian television series debuts
1996 Indian television series endings